Hans Maes is a senior philosophy lecturer and co-director of the Aesthetics Research Centre at the University of Kent. He is known for his work in aesthetics and philosophy of art.

Books
 Before Sunrise, Before Sunset, Before Midnight: A Philosophical Exploration. Routledge. 2021.
 Portraits and Philosophy. Routledge. 2020 
 Conversations on Art and Aesthetics. Oxford University Press. 2017
 Pornographic Art and the Aesthetics of Pornography. Palgrave. 2013
 Art and Pornography: Philosophical Essays, ed. H. Maes and J. Levinson. Oxford University Press. 2012

References

External links
University of Kent staff page
Conversations on Art and Aesthetics
 Before Sunrise, Before Sunset, Before Midnight
Interview with Hans Maes

Academics of the University of Kent
Living people
Philosophers of art
Old University of Leuven alumni
Year of birth missing (living people)